Christian Müller  (born 24 April 1976) is a German historian previously residing in Ningbo, China. His research focuses on global connections between the West and Asia from the early modern period to the 21st Century, emphasizing imperialism, transnationalism, normative orders, labour mobility, travel writing, encounters between civilizations, curiosity, and identities. 

Müller has a life-long affiliation to University College Oxford. In November 2018, he was elected as a Fellow of the Royal Historical Society. However, in February 2023, Müller was dismissed from his position at the University of Nottingham Ningbo China (UNNC), where he had been employed since August 2015. This decision followed allegations by the Chinese Ministry of Education in December 2022 that his PhD certificate was fraudulent.

Education 
Between 1995 and 1998, Müller studied History, Law, Politics, Germanic Languages at Heidelberg University. In 1999, he completed his Master of Studies in Modern History and Political Thought at University College, Oxford. Between 1999 and 2002, he studies History and Germanic Languages at Heidelberg University for a Master of Arts. Between 2003 and 2007, he was a doctoral student in History at the same university. In 2007, he stopped his doctoral studies and did not complete his thesis nor receive his PhD.

According to the official website of the Centre for History and Economics, Magdalene College, Cambridge, between 2007 and 2008, Müller was a "Mellon Visiting Scholar" at the Centre.Müller has repeatedly referred to this experience as "being a post-doctoral researcher", which implies that he had already succeeded in obtaining his doctorate in 2007. However, according to a collection of essays published in 2014 entitled Grenzüberschreitende Religion, Christian Müller, one of the contributors, did not have a PhD, only master's degrees. This book was completed in 2012, when he was working at the University of Münster. Furthermore, the official website of the University of Münster did not give him the title of "Dr." in the introduction to the book, while gave the title to another editor, Thies Schulze.

Academic career

In Europe 
Müller was a Junior Research Group Leader and Lecturer in Modern History at the Cluster of Excellence “Religion and Politics” at the University of Münster (2008-12). He was a visiting researcher at Ghent University (2011-13) and a Lecturer in History, Culture and Communications at HAWK University of Applied Sciences and Arts, Göttingen (2014-15). In Göttingen, he was writing a book entitled The Politics of Expertise: The Institutionalization of Transnational Legal and Social Networks in Europe, 1840–1914. However, this book project was aborted with his move to China.

In China 
Müller went to Ningbo, China in August 2015. He was an Associate Professor in Modern European and International History at UNNC (2015-2023). He worked as the Director of Research at School of International Studies, Co-Director of the Centre for Advanced International Studies, and the Director of the Global Institute for Silk Roads Studies (2018-2023) of this university. At UNNC, Müller received Lord Dearing Award (2020), Merit prize of "Four knows" of Ningbo Spirit Translation Competition (September 2020), and Vice-Chancellor’s Medal of the University of Nottingham (June 2018). 

He has been an Associate Fellow of the Higher Education Academy since July 2016. Since September 2018, he has held Visiting Fellowship at St Antony’s College, Oxford. Since May 2022, he has been a Fellow of the Peer Review College at Arts and Humanities Research Council (AHRC).

In China, Müller has previously worked with, guest lectured, or disseminated research findings at the Ningbo University, Tinyi Ge Library, Fudan University, and Princeton University Press' China division.

Works

Books 
 Travel Writings on Asia. Curiosity, Identities, and Knowledge across the East, c. 1200 to the Present (Palgrave Macmillan, 2022), with Matteo Salonia
 Grenzüberschreitende Religion: Vergleichs- und Kulturtransferstudien zur neuzeitlichen Geschichte [Cross-border Religion: Comparative and Cultural Transfer Studies on Modern History] (Vandenhoeck und Ruprecht Verlage, 2014), with Thies Schulze
 The Invention of Industrial Pasts: Heritage, Political Culture and Economic Debates in Great Britain and Germany, 1850-2010 (Wissner Verlag, 2013), with Peter Itzen
 Königin Viktoria und ihre Zeit [Queen Victoria and Her Time](Muster-Schmidt Verlag, 2004), with Edgar Feuchtwanger

Selected articles 
 "Corinne Chaponnière and Henry Dunant, The Man of the Red Cross." Social History of Medicine (2023).
 "And What Do We Know About China? The International Labour Office, Albert Thomas and Republican China, 1919-1930." Journal of the Royal Asiatic Society China 28.1 (2018): 101-122.
 "Peaks of Internationalism in Social Engineering: A Transnational History of International Social Reform Associations and Belgian Agency, 1860-1925."Revue belge de Philologie et d'Histoire 90.4 (2012): 1297-1319, with Jasmien Van Daele.
 "Designing the model European—Liberal and republican concepts of citizenship in Europe in the 1860s: The Association Internationale pour le Progrès des Sciences Sociales." History of European Ideas 37.2 (2011): 223-231.

Selected book chapters 
 "German Dreams of Empire in the Far East: The German Expeditions to the East and Ferdinand von Richthofen’s Encounters with Asia, 1850–1880." In Travel Writings on Asia: Curiosity, Identities, and Knowledge Across the East, c. 1200 to the Present. Singapore: Springer Nature Singapore (2022): 175-209.
 "Between Adoption and Resistance: China’s Efforts of ‘Understanding the West’, the Challenges of Transforming Monarchical Legitimacy and the Rise of Oriental Exceptionalism, 1860–1910." In International Flows in the Belt and Road Initiative Context: Business, People, History and Geography (2020): 219-252.
 "The Politics of Expertise: The Association Internationale pour le Progrès des Sciences Sociales. Democratic Peace Movements and International Law Networks in Europe 1858-75." In Shaping the Transnational Sphere: Experts, Networks, and Issues (c. 1850-1930). New York: Berghahn Books (2014).

References 

Fellows of the Royal Historical Society
People from Witten
Academics of the University of Nottingham
Alumni of the University of Oxford
German expatriates in China
German sinologists
21st-century German historians
1976 births
Living people
People who fabricated academic degrees